The 2004–05 Greek Football Cup was the 63rd edition of the Greek Football Cup. The competition started on 10 September 2004 and concluded on 21 May 2005 with the Greek Cup Final, held at the Pampeloponnisiako Stadium. Olympiacos earned the trophy with a 3–0 victory over Aris.

Calendar

Knockout phase
Each tie in the knockout phase, apart from the final, was played over two legs, with each team playing one leg at home. The team that scored more goals on aggregate over the two legs advanced to the next round. If the aggregate score was level, the away goals rule was applied, i.e. the team that scored more goals away from home over the two legs advanced. If away goals were also equal, then extra time was played. The away goals rule was again applied after extra time, i.e. if there were goals scored during extra time and the aggregate score was still level, the visiting team advanced by virtue of more away goals scored. If no goals were scored during extra time, the winners were decided by a penalty shoot-out. In the final, which were played as a single match, if the score was level at the end of normal time, extra time was played, followed by a penalty shoot-out if the score was still level.The mechanism of the draws for each round is as follows:
There are no seedings, and teams from the same group can be drawn against each other.

First round

|}

*Awarded. Poseidon Neon Poron did not show up.

Additional round

|}

Bracket

Round of 32

Summary

|}

Matches

Panathinaikos won 3–0 on aggregate.

AEL won 3–2 on aggregate.

Ptolemaida-Lignitorikhi won 3–1 on penalties.

AEK Athens won 7–1 on aggregate.

Egaleo won 2–0 on aggregate.

Round of 16

Summary

|}

Matches

Olympiacos won 2–1 on aggregate.

Kastoria won 4–3 on aggregate.

Aris won 4–2 on aggregate.

Skoda Xanthi won 1–0 on aggregate.

Panionios won 1–0 on aggregate.

AEL won 3–2 on aggregate.

Apollon Kalamarias won away goals.

AEK Athens won 4–2 on aggregate.

Quarter-finals

Summary

|}

Matches

AEK Athens won 2–0 on aggregate.

Olympiacos won 6–3 on aggregate.

 

Aris won on away goals.

Skoda Xanthi won 4–2 on aggregate.

Semi-finals

Summary

|}

Matches

Aris won 3–2 on aggregate.

Olympiacos won 3–1 on aggregate.

Final

References

External links
Greek Cup 2004-2005 at RSSSF
Greek Cup 2004-2005 at Hellenic Football Federation's official site

2004-05
2004–05 domestic association football cups
Cup